Facundo Eduardo Gattas Clavell (born 2  July 1995) is a Uruguay rugby union player who generally plays as a prop, playing for Old Glory DC professionally and Uruguay internationally. He was included in the Uruguayan squad for the 2019 Rugby World Cup which was held in Japan for the first time and also marked his first World Cup appearance.

Career 
He made his international debut for Uruguay against Canada on 6 February 2016. He was also part of the Uruguayan team which won the 2017 World Rugby Nations Cup. 

He got his professional debut in 2021 with Peñarol in Súper Liga Americana de Rugby (SLAR). He did not re-sign with Peñarol for a second season, instead returning to Argentinian amateur club Hindu. He returned to professional rugby when he was picked up by Old Glory DC in Major League Rugby partway through the 2022 season.

References

External links

1995 births
Living people
Uruguayan rugby union players
Uruguay international rugby union players
Rugby union props
Rugby union players from Montevideo
Peñarol Rugby players
Rugby union hookers
Old Glory DC players